William Leon Goldenberg (February 10, 1936 – August 3, 2020) was an American composer and songwriter, best known for his work on television and film.

Early life 
Goldenberg was born in February 10, 1936 in Brooklyn, New York, New York. His mother played the violin, and she taught him how to play the violin and the viola. Then he played it in chamber and symphonic groups. His father was a staff percussionist at WOR and the NBC Symphonic Orchestra. At age five, he played piano and sang Broadway shows.

He wanted a musical career but since his father was laid off, he was dissuaded in the early 1950s. Instead of attending Juilliard, he studied physics and mathematics at Columbia College.

Career 
After college, Goldenberg was a computer programmer, but he quit the job due to an ulcer. He found work as a pianist and arranger. He was hired to write the soundtrack for comedy sketches of Mike Nichols and Elaine May in the Broadway show, An Evening with Nichols and May.

In the mid-1960s, Goldenberg met Steven Spielberg at Universal Studios. He started to compose music for Spielberg's television episodes on shows such as The Name Of The Game, Night Gallery and the 1971 TV film, Duel. His other film scores included the Elvis Presley film Change of Habit (1969), The Grasshopper (1970), Red Sky at Morning (1971), The Last of Sheila (1973), Busting (1974), The Domino Principle (1977) and Reuben, Reuben (1983). He also wrote music for The Mary Tyler Moore Show, Columbo, and the first two episodes of Kojak, including the theme tune.

Additionally he wrote scores for Woody Allen's Play It Again, Sam (1972) and Up the Sandbox (1972). Later on, he was praised for all his works and his score for the Sandbox movie was considered 'the real pulse of the movie' and also if the score could be turned into a song. He wrote the song "If I Close My Eyes" for the Sandbox movie and then won an Emmy Award for the score of Queen of the Stardust Ballroom (1975). He earned 3 Emmy Awards for The Lives of Benjamin Franklin (1974) which described the life of Martin Luther King Jr., and also scored many TV movies, such as Fear No Evil (1969), Ritual of Evil (1970), Don't Be Afraid of the Dark (1973), Double Indemnity (1973), The UFO Incident (1975), Helter Skelter (1976), One of My Wives Is Missing (1976), The Lindbergh Kidnapping Case (1976), Mary Jane Harper Cried Last Night (1977), The Cracker Factory (1979), Crisis at Central High (1981), This House Possessed (1981), The Best Little Girl in the World (1981) and Massarati and the Brain (1982), and TV miniseries including The Gangster Chronicles (1981), Rage of Angels (1983), The Atlanta Child Murders (1985), Kane and Abel (1985) and Around the World in 80 Days (1989).

References

External links
 
 

1936 births
2020 deaths
American television composers
Musicians from Brooklyn
American film score composers
American male film score composers
20th-century American composers
21st-century American composers
Broadway composers and lyricists
Emmy Award winners
American male songwriters
20th-century American male musicians
21st-century American male musicians
Columbia College (New York) alumni